Upleta is a city and tehsil in the Rajkot district of the state of Gujarat, India.
It contains within it two towns and 49 villages.

Geography 

Demographics
As of the 2011 India census, Upleta had a population of 58,775. 51% of the population was male and 49% female. Upleta has an average literacy rate of 71%, higher than the national average of 59.5%. The male literacy rate is 76% and the female literacy rate is 65%. In Upleta, 11% of the population is under 6 years of age.

Transport
Rajkot and Porbandar are the nearest airports. Jamnagar is also near by airport around 100 km.

Residents of Upleta have easy access to a nearby highway, National Highway 8B. It connects the cities of Upleta with Rajkot, Porbandar, Jamnagar, Gondal and Jetpur. The State Transport Corporation and private bus operators provide bus services between the cities.

The Upleta(UA) Railway station has daily connectivity between Porbandar, Rajkot and Somnath. Also one weekly train to Santragachi Jn (SRC).

Places To Visit

::- Green Village Garden Restaurant 
OLocation on maps

References

External links
Rajkot City Guide
Green Village Garden Restaurant
Instagram of Green Village

Cities and towns in Rajkot district